Danger Ahead is a lost 1921 American silent romantic drama film directed by Rollin S. Sturgeon and starring Mary Philbin, still a teenager. It was based on a story The Harbour Road by Sara Ware Bassett. Universal Film Manufacturing Company produced and distributed the picture.

Cast
Mary Philbin as Tressie Harloow
James Morrison as Norman Minot
Jack Mower as Robert Kitteridge
Minna Redman as Deborah Harlow
George Bunny as Nate Harlow
George B. Williams as Mr. Minot
Jane Starr as Dolly Demere
Emily Rait as Mrs. Della Mayhew
Helene Caverly as Dora Mayhew

References

External links

Lantern slide (State University of New York (SUNY))

1921 films
American silent feature films
American black-and-white films
Lost American films
Films directed by Rollin S. Sturgeon
Films based on American novels
American romantic drama films
1921 romantic drama films
1921 lost films
Lost romantic drama films
1920s American films
Silent romantic drama films
Silent American drama films